Perfect Therapy is the eighth studio album by American singer-songwriter Andy Pratt, released in 1986 by GMI.

Track listing
"Where Is the Comfort" - 5:11
"Let Me See Your Face" - 4:27
"Pass Away" - 5:32
"More Than the Sky" - 3:28
"Now We Are One" - 2:47
"What's Gonna Happen To You" - 3:50
"Masterpiece" - 3:38
"Was It for Life" - 4:05
"I Let It Go" - 4:40
"How Lovely Is Your Dwelling Place" - 5:54

References

External links

Andy Pratt (singer-songwriter) albums
1986 albums